Scottish National Party depute leadership election may refer to:

 2004 Scottish National Party depute leadership election
 2014 Scottish National Party depute leadership election
 2016 Scottish National Party depute leadership election
 2018 Scottish National Party depute leadership election

See also
 Scottish National Party leadership election (disambiguation)